Potok pri Dornberku is a small settlement south of Dornberk in the Municipality of Nova Gorica in western Slovenia. It is located in the Vipava Valley, which is part of the Gorizia region of the Slovene Littoral.

Name
The name of the settlement was changed from Potok to Potok pri Dornberku in 1955.

References

External links
 
Potok pri Dornberku on Geopedia

Populated places in the City Municipality of Nova Gorica